Nowe Tłoki  is a settlement in the administrative district of Gmina Wolsztyn, within Wolsztyn County, Greater Poland Voivodeship, in west-central Poland.

The settlement has a population of 471.

References

Villages in Wolsztyn County